Yves Ropartz (3 June 1903 – 19 December 1983) was a French racing cyclist. He rode in the 1928 Tour de France.

References

1903 births
1983 deaths
French male cyclists
Place of birth missing